|}

The Martin Pipe Conditional Jockeys' Handicap Hurdle is a National Hunt hurdle race in Great Britain for conditional jockeys which is open to horses aged four years or older. It is run on the New Course at Cheltenham over a distance of about 2 miles and 4½ furlongs (2 miles 4 furlongs and 56 yards, or 4,075 metres), and during its running there are nine hurdles to be jumped. It is a handicap race, and it is scheduled to take place each year during the Cheltenham Festival in March.

The event was established in 2009 and is named in honour of Martin Pipe, a highly successful National Hunt trainer who retired in 2006. During his career Pipe was Champion Trainer fifteen times, and his record at the Cheltenham Festival included thirty-four victories.

Records
Most successful horse:
 no horse has won this race more than once
Leading jockey :
 no jockey has won this race more than once
Leading trainer (4 wins):
 Willie Mullins – Sir Des Champs (2011), Don Poli (2014), Killultagh Vic (2015), Galopin Des Champs (2021)

Winners
 Weights given in stones and pounds.

See also
 Horse racing in Great Britain
 List of British National Hunt races

References

 Racing Post:

National Hunt races in Great Britain
Cheltenham Racecourse
National Hunt hurdle races
Recurring sporting events established in 2009
2009 establishments in England